The College of St John the Evangelist or St Johns Theological College, is the residential theological college of the Anglican Church in Aotearoa, New Zealand and Polynesia.

The site at Meadowbank in Auckland is the base for theological education for the three Tikanga of the Province with ministry formation onsite as well as diploma level teaching in the regions across New Zealand and Polynesia.  The College has partnerships with various other tertiary providers of degrees in theology.  The College celebrates our diversity as a people of faith honouring varied histories, traditions, and links with Anglican communities both within this Province and beyond. St Johns is proud to have faculty and alumni of the College working around the globe.

The College was established in 1843 by George Augustus Selwyn, Bishop of New Zealand, initially at Te Waimate mission.

The College, through the St John's College Trust Board, is one of the best endowed theological colleges in the Anglican Communion, with assets in 2014 of NZ$293m. It was subject to a critical review of its financial sustainability in 2014.

Relationships with other organisations

It previously had an on-site ecumenical partnership with Trinity Methodist Theological College, the theological college of the Methodist Church of New Zealand.  However, St John's College now only has Anglican students.

Academic study
It taught the Licentiate in Theology (LTh) for the Joint Board of Theological Studies from 1968.

Later it offered Melbourne College of Divinity degrees, primarily the BD. From 1993 it offered the University of Auckland BTheol.

Undergraduate ordinands study a NZ Diploma in Christian Studies and then undertake the remaining years of their theology degree at Laidlaw College, Carey College or the University of Otago.

Other lay and ordained persons around NZ study the NZ Diploma in Christian Studies regionally (through weekend intensives) and by FlexiLearn (a distance learning programme with live online classes).

The John Kinder Theological Library
The John Kinder Theological Library Te Puna Atuatanga is the library and archives for the college as well as for the Anglican Church in Aotearoa New Zealand and Polynesia. Although based on the St John's College site, it also has responsibilities to the whole Church and all its theological educational enterprises. It is named after John Kinder, a former principal of the college.

Notable alumni and alumnae

Frank Buckland (1847–1915), MP and mayor
 Thomas Frederic Cheeseman, notable English born botanist and naturalist
Mary Gray-Reeves, bishop of the Episcopal Diocese of El Camino Real in California, US
 Hone Kaa
Trevor Ogilvie-Grant, 4th Baron Strathspey (1879–1948), member of the House of Lords
 Sir Edward Osborne-Gibbes, (1850–1931) — a baronet, former Secretary of the New Zealand Education Department and the architect of that country's modern public education system
 Dr. Sir Harry Wollaston  ISO, (1846–1921), Comptroller-General of Customs in Australia.
 Christopher Douglas-Huriwai, Co-host of RevTalk: The Mihinare Podcast, Presenter of RevLife, and social commentator.
 Zhane Rawiri Tahau Whelan, Co-host of RevTalk: The Mihinare Podcast, Presenter of RevLife, and first Prior of the Society of Emanuera.

References

External links
St. John's College website
John Kinder Theological Library website

Educational institutions established in 1843
Anglican seminaries and theological colleges
Seminaries and theological colleges in New Zealand
Education in Auckland
1843 establishments in New Zealand